Rajendra Prasad Pandey is a Nepalese politician, belonging to the CPN (Unified Socialist) currently serving as the Chief minister of Bagmati Province. He's also the deputy chairman of the CPN (Unified Socialist).

He became chief minister of the province with support of Nepali Congress, the ruling party of Nepal. In the 2017 Nepalese provincial election he was elected from the Dhading 1(A).

Electoral history

2017 Nepalese provincial elections

See also
 CPN (Unified Socialist)

References

External links

Living people
Communist Party of Nepal (Unified Socialist) politicians
1956 births

Chief Ministers of Nepalese provinces
Members of the Provincial Assembly of Bagmati Province
Nepal MPs 1991–1994
Nepal MPs 1994–1999
Nepal MPs 1999–2002
Members of the 2nd Nepalese Constituent Assembly
Nepal MPs 2022–present